The Honourable Catherine (French: L'honorable Catherine) is a 1943 French comedy film directed by Marcel L'Herbier and starring Edwige Feuillère, Raymond Rouleau and André Luguet. Some of the film's final scenes were directed by an uncredited Jacques de Baroncelli.

It was shot at the Buttes-Chaumont Studios in Paris. The film's sets were designed by the art director André Barsacq.

Cast

References

Bibliography 
 Rège, Philippe. Encyclopedia of French Film Directors, Volume 1. Scarecrow Press, 2009.

External links 
 

1943 films
French comedy films
1943 comedy films
1940s French-language films
Films directed by Jacques de Baroncelli
Films directed by Marcel L'Herbier
French black-and-white films
1940s French films

fr:L'Honorable Catherine